The Pennal Letter was a historical letter by Owain Glyndŵr to Charles VI, King of France. Owain composed the letter in Latin, in Pennal, in the north of Wales, in 1406, and set out his vision of an independent Wales.

The letter is regarded as unique as the only surviving written documentation detailing secular and religious policies for a potential independent Wales in the Middle Ages.

In the letter, Owain pledges obedience to Antipope Benedict XIII of Avignon, supported by Charles VI during the Avignon Papacy, as opposed to the Province of Canterbury and Pope Innocent VII, the pope in Rome, who was supported by the English king Henry IV. He describes the English government as "the barbarous Saxons, who usurped to themselves the land of Wales" and calls for Pope Benedict XIII to try and punish Henry IV as a heretic for the burning of many church buildings and the execution of members of the Welsh church.

History 

The letter was sent by Owain Glyndŵr in 1406 to the king of France, Charles V asking for assistance in fighting against English rule in Wales. Glyndŵr outlines his hopes to establish an independent Welsh church and the ability of clergy to speak Welsh. He also sets out his plans for founding two universities in Wales.

Location 
The letter is held in the National Archives of France (J516 B.40 and J516.29). It was briefly exhibited at the National Library of Wales in 2000, and there is a campaign  for its permanent return and display at the Senedd in Cardiff. Six exact facsimile copies, on aged parchment sealed with moulds of the original seal of Glyndŵr, were made by the National Library of Wales and presented to six Welsh institutions in 2009.

Mark Drakeford, First Minister of Wales was shown the letter on his visit to Paris to strengthen the Welsh relationship with France.

References

15th-century documents
Glyndŵr Rising
Pennal
Political history of Wales